The 1984 Houston Oilers season was the 25th season overall and 15th with the league. The team improved upon their previous season's output of 2–14, winning three games, but failed to qualify for the playoffs for the fourth consecutive season. With hopes of improving the offense the Oilers won the bidding war to sign CFL star and future Hall of Fame quarterback Warren Moon. However, with Earl Campbell in full decline, the Oilers decided to trade him to the Saints after a 1–5 start. The move would leave a gaping hole at running back, but it was the defense that was a greater weak spot as the Oilers finished with a 3–13 record, allowing 457 points on the season.

Regular season
Despite acquiring CFL star Warren Moon at quarterback, the Oilers stumbled out of the gate, falling to 0–10 before picking up a 17–16 win on the road against the Kansas City Chiefs. The following week they beat the New York Jets 31–20. In that game Moon tossed two touchdown passes to Tim Smith and one to Herkie Walls. The Oilers defense intercepted a Ken O'Brien pass. They picked up their third and final win of the season in overtime against the Pittsburgh Steelers 23–20. Moon connected with tight end Chris Dressell for a touchdown, while Steelersʼ quarterback Mark Malone tossed two interceptions – one to rookie Bo Eason and the other to Willie Tullis. The Oilers finished the season in last place in the AFC Central with a 3–13 record.

Offseason
The 1984 draft would yield some solid players for Houston. They selected Dean Steinkuhler in round one. They used their second round choice to draft Doug Smith out of Auburn, but he spurred the Oilers to sign with the Philadelphia Stars of the USFL. The draft also saw Houston land Johnny Meads, Jeff Donaldson, John Grimsley and Patrick Allen.

Transactions
October 10, 1984: The Houston Oilers traded running back Earl Campbell to the New Orleans Saints in exchange for their top choice in the 1985 NFL Draft.

NFL draft

The following players were selected in the 1984 NFL draft.

Supplemental draft

The following players were selected in the 1984 NFL supplemental draft.

Personnel

Staff

Roster

Regular season

Schedule

Standings

Season summary

Week 2: vs. Indianapolis Colts

Week 8 (Sunday, October 21, 1984): vs. San Francisco 49ers 

Point spread: 49ers by 11
 Over/Under: 42.0 (over)
 Time of Game:

Week 15

References

Houston Oilers seasons
Houston Oilers
Houston